Eugenia Grandet is a 1953 Mexican drama film directed by Emilio Gómez Muriel and starring Marga López, Julio Villarreal and Andrea Palma. It is based on the 1833 French novel Eugénie Grandet by Honoré de Balzac.

Cast
 Marga López as Eugenia Grandet
 Julio Villarreal as Don Eugenio Grandet  
 Andrea Palma as Matilde Grandet  
 Ramón Gay as Carlos Grandet
 Hortensia Santoveña as Ana,  (maid)  
 José Pidal as Señor Santiesteban,  (banker)  
 Enrique Díaz 'Indiano' as Pedro López,  (notary)  
 Armando Velasco as Padre Agustín (Father Agustín)
 Lilia Fernández  as Laura
 Ángel Merino as Luis Santiesteban  
 María Gentil Arcos as Señora Santiesteban 

References

Bibliography 
 Goble, Alan. The Complete Index to Literary Sources in Film. Walter de Gruyter, 1999.

External links 
 

1953 films
1953 drama films
Mexican drama films
1950s Spanish-language films
Films based on Eugénie Grandet
Films directed by Emilio Gómez Muriel
Mexican black-and-white films
1950s Mexican films